"Dane-geld" is a poem by British writer Rudyard Kipling (1865-1936). It relates to the unwisdom of paying "Danegeld", or what is nowadays called blackmail and protection money. The most famous lines are "once you have paid him the Danegeld/ You never get rid of the Dane."

Excerpt
The poem ends thus:

Background

The poem is subtitled "(AD 980-1016)". In 978, Æthelred the Unready was crowned king of England. In 980,  small companies of Danish adventurers carried out a series of coastline raids against England. The raids continued; and in 991, Æthelred paid the Danes in silver to stop raiding and to go away. The Danes thought this an excellent ideaand returned year after year to demand more. In Kipling's words: "if once you have paid him the Dane-geld, you never get rid of the Dane". The practice only ceased in 1016, when the Scandinavian ruler Canute the Great invaded England, won its crown, and established control over the country.

Publication history

The poem was first published in 1911, in A School History of England by C. R. L. Fletcher and Rudyard Kipling. It was included in all subsequent editions. Fletcher's description of the historical events has been said to be "lurid" and to contain "over-heavy sarcasm" when drawing parallels with the time of writing.

T. S. Eliot included the poem in his 1941 collection A Choice of Kipling's Verse.

The poem has been included in collected editions of Kipling's works; and presumably also in poetry anthologies, because it has been quoted by 21st-century historical and political writers.

Legacy
Kipling did not invent the expression "paying someone Dane-geld"; but it has become attached to him, even in books of quotations. In the 1930s, it was invoked against the British government's policy of appeasing Nazi Germany.

In 1984, Margaret Thatcher quoted Kipling (Stanza 6) in her Conservative Party speech in Brighton.

In 2008, American historian Richard Abels quoted from the poem as an introduction to his own study of Danegeld. In 2011, Norwegian philosopher Ole Martin Moen quoted from the poem in an argument against paying ransoms to Somali pirates for the release of hostages.

Leslie Fish has set "Dane-geld" to music and performed it, along with other settings of Kipling, on her 1985 album The Undertaker's Horse.

References

1911 poems
Poetry by Rudyard Kipling